Peter Sullivan (born 22 June 1998) is an Irish rugby union player, currently playing for Pro14 and European Rugby Champions Cup side Connacht. He plays in the  wing.

Connacht
Sullivan made his Connacht debut against Ulster on 23 August 2020.

International
Sullivan has represented the Ireland Sevens side in 2 World Series competitions.

References

External links
itsrugby.co.uk Profile

1998 births
Living people
Irish rugby union players
Connacht Rugby players
Rugby union wings
Rugby union players from Dublin (city)
Irish rugby sevens players
Ireland international rugby sevens players